Daniel Dominique Arasse (5 November 1944 in Algiers – 14 December 2003 in Paris) was a French art historian who specialised in the Renaissance and Italian art. His publication, Le Détail, Pour une histoire rapprochée de la peinture (1992) won the Charles-Blanc Prize in 1993.

References 

1944 births
2003 deaths
French art historians